Bacri is a French surname. Notable people with the surname include:

 Jean-Pierre Bacri (1951–2021), French actor and screenwriter
 Nicolas Bacri (born 1961), French composer
  (1926–2014), French journalist and poet

French-language surnames